Bal Krishan Anand (1917–2007) was an Indian physiologist and pharmacologist. He was credited for the discovery of the  feeding center in the  hypothalamus in 1951. He is considered  the founder of modern Neurophysiology in India.

He was born in Lahore as Bal Krishan Anand in 1917. He was graduated from King George Medical College in 1940 and obtained his M.D. degree in 1948. He  joined in 1949 the Lady Hardinge Medical College as Professor of Physiology.

He went to Yale University as a Fellow of the Rockefeller Foundation in 1950 and worked with  John Brobeck. They had published their  research work in 1951. He \ returned to India in 1952 and continued his research in Lady Hardinge Medical College.

He  joined the All India Institute of Medical Sciences as its first professor in the Department of Physiology in 1956. He was instrumental in establishing the guidelines of education for M.B., B.S. and Postgraduate students.  He became Dean of that Institute.

He was instrumental in the establishment of Sher-i-Kashmir Institute of Medical Sciences in 1982.

Bibliography
 B. K. Anand and J. R. Brobeck: Hypothalamic control of food intake in rats and cats. Yale J. Biol. Med. 24:123-40, 1951.
 B. K. Anand and S. Dua: Hypothalamic involvement in the Pituitary Adrenocortical Response. Journal of Physiology. I955. I27, I53-I56.
 B. K. Anand and S. Dua: Circulatory and Respiratory changes induced by Electrical stimulation of Limbic system (Visceral brain). Journal of Neurophysiology. 19: 393-400, 1956.
 B. K. Anand, S. Dua and Baldev Singh. Electrical activity of the hypothalamic 'feeding centres' under the effect of changes in blood chemistry, Electroencephalography and Clinical Neurophysiology. Volume 13, Issue 1, February 1961, Pages 54–59.
 B. K. Anand, G. S. Chhina, and Baldev Singh. Effect of Glucose on the Activity of Hypothalamic "Feeding Centers".  Science 2 November 1962: Vol. 138. no. 3540, pp. 597 – 598.

Awards
 He was awarded the Shanti Swarup Bhatnagar Prize for Science and Technology in Medical Sciences in 1963.
 Government of India awarded him Padma Shri in Medicine in 1969.
 He was a fellow of the National Academy of Medical Sciences, Indian National Science Academy and the Indian Academy of Sciences.
 The Medical Council of India awarded him the Dr. B. C. Roy Award in 1984.

References

Indian physiologists
1917 births
2007 deaths
Recipients of the Padma Shri in medicine
Rockefeller Fellows
Indian medical educators
Indian pharmacologists
Fellows of the Indian National Science Academy
Academic staff of the All India Institute of Medical Sciences, New Delhi
Indian medical academics
Scientists from Lahore
Dr. B. C. Roy Award winners
Fellows of the National Academy of Medical Sciences
Fellows of the Indian Academy of Sciences
20th-century Indian biologists
Indian scientific authors
King George's Medical University alumni
University of Lucknow alumni
Recipients of the Shanti Swarup Bhatnagar Award in Medical Science
Indian expatriates in the United States